Ra is the second studio album and third release by Utopia on Bearsville Records, released in 1977. Rundgren planned on releasing the LP in 1976 on his own label "Ethereal Records" as the new 4 piece line up was not signed to Bearsville. Replete with an elaborate $250,000 stage show featuring a  pyramid and golden sphinx which took 18 months of prep, Ra was Rundgren's most ambitious live undertaking.

The cornerstone of the album and show is "Singring and the Glass Guitar," which comprises solos by each band member battling the elements: water (drums), wind (bass), fire (keyboards), and earth (guitar).

The album was modestly successful, peaking the Billboard Top 200 at #79.

Track listing

A number of test pressings (and a very limited amount of vinyl and 8 track tape pressings) were made using a rejected master that includes alternate mixes of the some of the tracks on the album. The songs "Communion with the Sun" and "Sunburst Finish" are almost entirely different takes- "Communion with the Sun" has a more aggressive drum track, alternate vocals and instrumental solos; "Sunburst Finish" has lead vocals that are similar but different backing vocals (with some present in the commonly released mix missing completely). "Singring and the Glass Guitar" is missing the intro to Willie Wilcox's drum solo. All the other tracks on this pressing are indistinguishable from the commonly released master.

With the exception of the European pressing, the only way to tell if a particular copy of an LP (or tape) was pressed from the rejected master is by playing it. In Europe, A1 or B1 will be written into the dead wax of the vinyl of these initial pressings. It is unknown exactly how many pressings from the rejected master were manufactured.

Side one

Side two

Personnel 
 Todd Rundgren - Electric guitar,  lead vocals, backing vocals, piano and saxophone on "Magic Dragon Theatre"
 Roger Powell - Keyboard, lead vocals, backing vocals
 Kasim Sulton - Bass guitar, lead vocals, backing vocals
 John "Willie" Wilcox - Drums, percussion, lead vocals, backing vocals, harmony guitar on "Jealousy"

Production
 Producer:  Todd Rundgren for Alchemedia Productions, Inc.
 Engineer, Calligrapher, & Voice of the Story Teller:  John Holbrook
 Assistant Engineer:  Tom Mark
 "Communion with the Sun" & "Jealousy" recorded at the Turtle Creek Barn using custom equipment owned and operated by Yes engineer Eddie Offord
 Musical arrangements by Utopia

Charts
Album - Billboard

References

Todd Rundgren albums
1977 albums
Albums produced by Todd Rundgren
Utopia (band) albums
Bearsville Records albums
Rhino Records albums
Egyptian mythology in music